Supercool is a 2021 action comedy film directed by Teppo Airaksinen and written by Olli Haikka. Setting in the American high school milieu, the film tells the story about a boy who wishes to be cool enough to socialize with his admiration, and when the wish comes true, he suddenly wakes up one morning to a different reality. The film stars Jake Short, Miles J. Harvey and Madison Davenport.

The film premiered at the San Francisco International Film Festival on April 9, 2021 and was released on February 11, 2022.

Premise 
Best friends, Neil (Jake Short) and Gilbert (Miles J. Harvey) start their senior year of high school with high hopes and aspirations. Neil has always fantasized about being cool enough to date his long-time crush Summer (Madison Davenport) and Gilbert has always dreamed of being a social media superstar. After what is, by all accounts, a very disappointing and embarrassing first day in school, Neil makes a magical wish to be cool just at the magical moment when the clock strikes 11:11. The next morning, Neil wakes up to a reality that is straight from the comics of his dreams. With the assistance of Neil's charismatic neighbor, Jimmy (Damon Wayans Jr.), and Gilbert's wild ideas, Neil endures one epic night.

Cast
Jake Short as Neil
Miles J. Harvey as Gilbert
Madison Davenport as Summer
Odessa A'zion as Jaclyn
Iliza Shlesinger as Victoria
Damon Wayans Jr. as Jimmy
Peter Moses as Justin
Jonathan Kite as Uber Driver
Kira Kosarin as Ava
Madison Bailey as Emily
Will Meyers as Chad
Greg Cromer as Officer Shepherd
Luis Fernandez-Gil as Officer Ramirez

Reception 
On the review aggregator website Rotten Tomatoes, the film holds an approval rating of 40% based on 10 reviews, with an average rating of 4.9/10.

References

External links

2021 films
American action comedy films
American fantasy comedy films
Canadian action comedy films
Canadian fantasy comedy films
English-language Canadian films
English-language Finnish films
Finnish action films
Finnish comedy films
Finnish fantasy films
Films about magic
Films set in Alabama
Films shot in Alabama
2020s English-language films
2020s Canadian films
2020s American films